Christian Magdalus Thestrup Cold (10 June 1863 – 7 December 1934) was a Danish politician and shipowner. He was Governor of the Danish West Indies from 1905 to 1908, Chief Executive Officer of Det Forenede Dampskibs-Selskab from 1908 to 1921, and Minister of Foreign Affairs from 1921 to 1924.

References 

1863 births
1934 deaths
Governors of the Danish West Indies
Danish business executives
Foreign ministers of Denmark